Gobles is a city in Van Buren County of the U.S. state of Michigan.  As of the 2010 census, the city population was 829.  It was originally called Gobleville, after its founders, the Goble family.

History
In 1864–1865, John Goble built a hotel at this location. In 1870, a plot was laid out as Gobleville by Hiram E. Goble. Warren Goble plotted an addition to the original plot two years later. Hiram Goble also became the first postmaster on April 16, 1872 when the post office was moved from Lake Mills. Gobleville was incorporated as a village in 1893. The current name of Gobles was adopted on April 10, 1922. Gobles was incorporated as a city in 1957.

On April 6, 2012, a fire raged throughout downtown in which six fire departments were called in. The various buildings that were destroyed were over 100 years old.

Geography

Demographics

2010 census
As of the census of 2010, there were 829 people, 320 households, and 210 families living in the city. The racial makeup of the city was 93.1% White, 0.6% African American, 0.2% Native American, 1.7% from other races, and 4.3% from two or more races. Hispanic or Latino of any race were 4.9% of the population.

There were 320 households, of which 35.3% had children under the age of 18 living with them, 45.3% were married couples living together, 14.1% had a female householder with no husband present, 6.3% had a male householder with no wife present, and 34.4% were non-families. 29.7% of all households were made up of individuals, and 15% had someone living alone who was 65 years of age or older. The average household size was 2.59 and the average family size was 3.24.

The median age in the city was 37.7 years. 27.6% of residents were under the age of 18; 6.9% were between the ages of 18 and 24; 26% were from 25 to 44; 26.7% were from 45 to 64; and 12.7% were 65 years of age or older. The gender makeup of the city was 47.6% male and 52.4% female.

2000 census
As of the census of 2000, there were 815 people, 314 households, and 209 families living in the city. The racial makeup of the city was 94.11% White, 1.84% Native American, 0.12% Asian, 1.10% from other races, and 2.82% from two or more races. Hispanic or Latino of any race were 2.33% of the population.

There were 314 households, out of which 35.0% had children under the age of 18 living with them, 44.9% were married couples living together, 16.9% had a female householder with no husband present, and 33.4% were non-families. 28.7% of all households were made up of individuals, and 15.0% had someone living alone who was 65 years of age or older. The average household size was 2.57 and the average family size was 3.13.

In the city, the population was spread out, with 30.6% under the age of 18, 8.2% from 18 to 24, 29.2% from 25 to 44, 18.8% from 45 to 64, and 13.3% who were 65 years of age or older. The median age was 34 years. For every 100 females, there were 81.9 males. For every 100 females age 18 and over, there were 76.3 males.

The median income for a household in the city was $26,917, and the median income for a family was $33,194. Males had a median income of $31,250 versus $21,818 for females. The per capita income for the city was $12,804. About 16.4% of families and 18.3% of the population were below the poverty line, including 21.0% of those under age 18 and 17.8% of those age 65 or over.

Attractions
The Kal-Haven Trail, which runs from Kalamazoo to South Haven, Michigan, goes through the city's business district.

Notable people
Tubby Meyers - college football player and coach for Western Michigan, was born in Gobleville.
Tyler Hunt - college football player for Michigan State, was born in Gobles

References

Sources

Cities in Van Buren County, Michigan
Kalamazoo–Portage metropolitan area
Populated places established in 1864